The Battle of Lewis's Farm (also known as Quaker Road, Military Road, or Gravelly Run) was fought on March 29, 1865, in Dinwiddie County, Virginia near the end of the American Civil War. In climactic battles at the end of the Richmond–Petersburg Campaign, usually referred to as the Siege of Petersburg, starting with Lewis's Farm, the Union Army commanded by Lieutenant General Ulysses S. Grant dislodged the Confederate Army of Northern Virginia commanded by General Robert E. Lee from defensive lines at Petersburg, Virginia and the Confederate capital of Richmond, Virginia. Many historians and the United States National Park Service consider the Battle of Lewis's Farm to be the opening battle of the Appomattox Campaign, which resulted in the surrender of Lee's army on April 9, 1865.

In the early morning of March 29, 1865, two corps of the Union Army of the Potomac, the V Corps under Major General Gouverneur K. Warren and the II Corps under Major General Andrew A. Humphreys, moved to the south and west of the Union line south of Petersburg toward the end of the Confederate line. The Confederate defenses were manned by the Fourth Corps of the Army of Northern Virginia under the command of Lieutenant General Richard H. Anderson. The corps only included  the division of Major General Bushrod Johnson.

Turning north and marching up the Quaker Road toward the Confederate line, Warren's lead brigade, commanded by Brigadier General Joshua Chamberlain, engaged three brigades of Johnson's division at the Lewis Farm. Reinforced by a four-gun artillery battery and later relieved by two large regiments from the brigade commanded by Colonel (Brevet Brigadier General) Edgar M. Gregory, the Union troops ultimately forced the Confederates back to their defenses and captured an important road junction. Chamberlain was wounded and narrowly escaped capture. Union Colonel (Brevet Brigadier General) Alfred L. Pearson was awarded the Medal of Honor 32 years later for his heroic actions at the battle.

Casualties were nearly even at 381 for the Union and 371 for the Confederates, but as the battle ended, Warren's corps held an important objective, a portion of the Boydton Plank Road at its junction with the Quaker Road. Within hours, Major General Philip Sheridan's cavalry corps, which was still acting apart from the Army of the Potomac as the Army of the Shenandoah, occupied Dinwiddie Court House. This action also severed the Boydton Plank Road. The Union forces were close to the Confederate line and poised to attack the Confederate flank, the important road junction of Five Forks and the two Confederate railroad lines to Petersburg and Richmond that remained open to the two cities.

On April 2–3, 1865, the Confederates evacuated Petersburg and Richmond and began to move to the west. After a number of setbacks and mostly small battles, but including a significant Confederate defeat at the Battle of Sailor's Creek on April 6, 1865, Lee surrendered his army to Grant and his pursuing Union Army on April 9, 1865 at Appomattox Court House, about 25 miles (40 km) east of Lynchburg, Virginia. By the end of June 1865, all Confederate armies had surrendered and the Confederacy's government had collapsed.

Background

Military situation

Richmond–Petersburg Campaign

On June 15–18, 1864, two Union Army corps, moved unobserved from the stalemated battle lines just north of Richmond across the James River to the south of Petersburg, Virginia. The Union force which joined with the Union Army of the James at Petersburg failed to seize the city from a small force of Confederate defenders at the Second Battle of Petersburg. By June 18, 1864, the Army of Northern Virginia had reinforced the defenders and the 292-day Richmond–Petersburg Campaign (Siege of Petersburg) had begun.

Grant's strategy had to become a campaign of trench warfare attrition in which the Union forces tried to wear down the Confederate Army, destroy or cut off sources of supply and supply lines to Petersburg and Richmond and to extend the lines which the outnumbered and declining Confederate force had to defend to the breaking point.

During the rest of 1864 and early 1865, Grant slowly moved his forces in the Union line south of Petersburg to the west in six more Petersburg offensives, usually with simultaneous attacks at or near the Richmond lines. The Confederates extended their lines to compensate for these moves, but they were stretched increasingly thin. With supplies and men increasingly hard for Lee to obtain or replace, he knew that his army could not defend Petersburg and Richmond from the growing Union forces indefinitely, especially with the expected arrival of Union reinforcements from recent recruits in training, Major General Philip Sheridan's cavalry divisions from the Shenandoah Valley and possibly even Major General William T. Sherman's armies already operating in North Carolina when the roads dried out after spring rains abated.

After the Battle of Hatcher's Run on February 5–7, 1865 extended the lines another , Lee had few reserves after manning the new defenses. He then knew that part or all of his army must leave the Richmond and Petersburg lines, obtain food and supplies at Danville, Virginia or possibly Lynchburg, Virginia and join General Joseph E. Johnston's force opposing Sherman's army. If the Confederates could quickly defeat Sherman, they might turn back to oppose Grant before he could combine his forces with the remainder of Sherman's. Lee began preparations for the movement and informed Confederate President Jefferson Davis and Confederate States Secretary of War John C. Breckinridge of his conclusions and plan.

Lee accepted Major General John B. Gordon's proposal to attempt to break the Union lines and threaten their supply base at City Point, Virginia by attacking along a narrow front near Fort Stedman, east of Petersburg and south of the Appomattox River, in order to compel Grant to shorten his lines, at least temporarily. If successful, this could give Lee an opportunity to shorten his lines and an opening and head start in a movement to the west and toward North Carolina.

After Gordon's Confederates surprise attack on Fort Stedman in the pre-dawn hour of March 25, 1865 had some initial success, a Union counterattack at the Battle of Fort Stedman recaptured the fort and forced the Confederates to return to their lines and give up their advance picket line, including much of the western part of that line in the afternoon at the Battle of Jones's Farm. The Confederates suffered about 4,000 casualties which they could ill afford. After the defeat at Fort Stedman, Lee knew that he could not detach part of his army and be able to maintain the defenses of Petersburg and Richmond. He also knew that Grant would soon move against the only remaining Confederate supply lines to Petersburg, the Southside Railroad and the Boydton Plank Road, beyond the end of his current defenses.

Grant's orders

Grant already had issued orders on March 24, 1865 for an offensive to begin on March 29 and was not deterred by the Battle of Fort Stedman. Grant planned for Sheridan's cavalry to cut the remaining open railroads, the Southside Railroad and the Richmond and Danville Railroad to Richmond, and for the infantry to turn the Confederates out of their positions if possible. On March 28, Grant told Sheridan to lead his troops around the Confederate right flank and to fight the Confederates, with infantry support, if the Confederates came out of their trenches. Otherwise, Sheridan should wreck the railroads as much as possible and either return to the Petersburg lines or join Sherman in North Carolina at his discretion.

Grant ordered two corps of the Army of the Potomac, the V Corps under Major General Gouverneur K. Warren and the II Corps under Major General Andrew A. Humphreys, to support Sheridan on his right flank, to the east of his objectives. Grant wanted these infantry corps to outflank the Confederates in their defenses and prevent them from interfering with Sheridan's mission, pushing them back to their lines if they came out to fight. Warren's corps initially also was ordered to seize Dinwiddie Court House, Virginia, which also would capture a portion of the Boydton Plank Road at that location, but later that task was given to Sheridan.

Under Grant's order, on the night of March 27–28, Major General Edward Ord, quietly moved units from the  Army of the James, including two divisions of Major General John Gibbon's XXIV Corps, a division of Major General Godfrey Weitzel's XXV Corps and Brigadier General Ranald S. Mackenzie's cavalry division from the Richmond lines to fill in the Petersburg lines to be vacated by the II Corps when they moved to support Sheridan. Confederate Lieutenant General James Longstreet's corps defending the Richmond lines failed to detect Ord's movement, thus limiting the number of men Lee could move to counter the movement of Grant's forces without fatally weakening the Richmond lines.

Description of area roads

A good verbal description of the roads and positions in the area, given by Brigadier General Joshua Chamberlain in his 1915 book The Passing of the Armies, is recited in the footnote.

Initial movements: March 29

Warren's V Corps of over 17,000 men moved from their reserve position south of the Union front line on the Stage Road at 3:00 a.m. on March 29, crossed Rowanty Creek and proceeded west on Vaughan Road to the intersection with Quaker Road. Warren reported to his immediate superior, Major General George G. Meade, who remained in direct tactical command of the Army of the Potomac, that Dinwiddie Court House was undefended. By 8:45 a.m., Meade sent an order to Warren which arrived at 10:20 a.m., and told Warren to advance in strength on the Quaker Road across Gravelly Run and contact the II Corps to his right. Warren misunderstood or ignored the order and sent only Brigadier General Joshua Chamberlain's brigade up the Quaker Road until noon. Then Warren sent other units forward in response to a second order from Meade.

The II Corps moved from Hatcher's Run at about 6:30 a.m. Humphreys was careful not to leave a gap between his corps at Hatcher's Run and the troops of the XXIV Corps which took the positions in the Union line that were being vacated by the II Corps. Meade wanted the V Corps to move up the Quaker Road to prevent a gap developing between the V Corps and the II Corps.

After having moved over the Vaughan Road to within  of Dinwiddie Court House, Chamberlain's brigade marched a short distance back to the Quaker Road and led the Union advance north on that road, as Meade had ordered Warren.

When Confederate scouts reported that a large force of Union infantry was moving north on Quaker Road, Anderson ordered Johnson to drive them back to Vaughan Road. Three Confederate regiments of the brigade commanded by Brigadier General Henry A. Wise, followed by the brigades of Brigadier Generals William H. Wallace, Young Marshall Moody and Matt Whitaker Ransom, moved south on the Quaker Road and the Boydton Plank Road with the intent of carrying out the order.

Opposing forces

Union

Confederate

Battle

Fighting begins

Chamberlain placed the 198th Pennsylvania Infantry on the right side of the road to fire on the Confederates as a diversion while he led the 185th New York Volunteer Infantry across Gravelly Run to attack the Confederate right flank where a hand-to-hand fight developed. Both Union regiments were oversize for that time period with about 1,000 officers and men. The rest of Chamberlain's brigade crossed the stream following the New Yorkers' attack. The Confederates retreated to the Lewis farmhouse clearing about  further north on the Quaker Road. After a stand near the farmhouse, the Confederates moved back into the woods where they were reinforced by other Confederate soldiers behind breastworks. Here, the Confederates drove back the advancing Union skirmishers but not without losing about 100 men as prisoners. Chamberlain brought the rest of his men forward and the Confederates who had moved out to meet the skirmishers again returned to their works.

Chamberlain wounded; rallies his men

After a pause in the fighting, Chamberlain's division commander, Brigadier General (Brevet Major General) Charles Griffin came forward and told Chamberlain that the Confederate position must be taken. Deploying men to both sides of the Quaker Road, Chamberlain, on horseback, led a charge up the Quaker Road toward the Confederate strong point, a large sawdust pile that provided cover for many Confederate soldiers. Chamberlain got ahead of his men and became an obvious target. He was wounded in the arm and his horse was wounded in the neck. Chamberlain slumped on his horse, initially unconscious, but regained consciousness in time to respond to General Griffin who had come up to check on Chamberlain's condition. Then Chamberlain rallied his Pennsylvania regiment who were retreating from a Confederate charge. When his wounded horse could not continue, Chamberlain went to the front of his line on foot. Several Confederate soldiers soon appeared and demanded Chamberlain's surrender. Chamberlain had lost his hat and was wearing a faded coat, almost gray in color. Pretending to be a Confederate officer, he led the Confederates back toward Union soldiers who promptly captured them.

Union reinforcements drive back Confederates

After another brief pause, Chamberlain saw that his New York regiment was being driven back from an attempt to take the Confederate works in the woods ahead. Chamberlain and the regiment's officers steadied the men and soon they pushed the Confederates back until Union artillery under Regular Army Lieutenant John Mitchell came up with four guns to support them. Despite the artillery fire, the Confederates tried to outflank and charge the Union position. Chamberlain's men and the artillery held the position, but then the Confederates charged the Pennsylvania troops in the center and on the right of the Union position. These Union soldiers were nearly out of ammunition and began to slowly retreat.

As Chamberlain's line was falling back, his First Brigade was reinforced by the 188th New York Volunteer Infantry Regiment and the 155th Pennsylvania Volunteer Infantry Regiment (Zouaves) of Colonel (Brevet Brigadier General) Edgar M. Gregory's Second Brigade. Colonel (Brevet Brigadier General) Alfred L. Pearson led the Pennsylvanians to the center and toward the sawdust pile that the Confederates were using for cover. Pearson grabbed the regimental colors and charged toward the sawdust pile with his men following and passing through the ranks of the exhausted First Brigade. Thirty-two years later, Pearson was awarded the Medal of Honor for his actions at Lewis's Farm.

When they saw these Union reinforcements, the Confederates retreated to their main entrenchments along White Oak Road, abandoning control of the Boydton Plank Road and leaving behind badly wounded men and some others who surrendered. Chamberlain then positioned his men along with the artillery battery on either side and in front of the Lewis farm buildings.

Number engaged; casualties

Chamberlain wrote that he had fewer than 1,700 officers and men in his brigade and that his reinforcements numbered about 1,000. He wrote that the Confederates had 6,277 effective officers and men in Johnson's Division according to their morning report. He stated that he lost about a quarter of his men while the Confederate total loss was "slight in numbers," although in a paragraph after this statement he said that he saw that evening 150 dead and severely wounded Confederates lying around the breastworks and noted that almost 200 prisoners had been taken by his brigade. Modern casualty estimates are 381 for the Union force and 371 for the Confederates.

Aftermath

Union positions

Warren was able to take a position near the junction of the Quaker Road and the Boydton Plank Road. Griffin's division and Brigadier General Samuel Crawford's division taking up positions along the Boydton Plank Road, the Union movements on March 29 and Chamberlain's success in taking the Lewis Farm position enabled the Union Army to cut this important communication and supply road and to set up to attack the White Oak Road Line. Having to deal with muddy roads over a longer route, Sheridan's cavalry divisions reached Dinwiddie Court House at about 5:00 p.m. on March 29, 1865. Sheridan put troops of Devin's and Crook's divisions into position to guard the Vaughan Road, Flat Foot Road, Boydton Plank Road and Adams Road.

Grant's change in orders

Encouraged by the Confederate failure to press their attack at Lewis's Farm and their withdrawal to their White Oak Road Line, Grant decided to expand Sheridan's mission to a major offensive rather than just a railroad raid and forced extension of the Confederate line. He wrote in his letter to Sheridan: "I now feel like ending the matter...."

Lee's actions

Lee had anticipated that with the Confederate defeat at Fort Stedman and the arrival of Sheridan's cavalry at Petersburg, Grant would make a move on Lee's right flank such as Grant had ordered on March 24. In the morning on March 29, Lee prepared to have Major General George Pickett take this force to Sutherland Station and move to protect Five Forks in Dinwiddie County. Lee also ordered Major General Fitzhugh Lee to take his cavalry division to Sutherland Station and join with the cavalry divisions of Major Generals Rooney Lee and Thomas L. Rosser. Fitzhugh Lee was ordered to take command of the combined cavalry.

The Union Army movement on March 29 troubled Lee so he ordered additional movements to strengthen his right flank. Besides moving Brigadier General Samuel McGowan's brigade farther west to extend Johnson's line along White Oak Road, he thinned the White Oak Road line further by moving Brigadier General William MacRae's brigade to the west. After arriving at Sutherland Station on the night of March 29, as ordered, Pickett moved his three brigades under Brigadier Generals George H. Steuart and Montgomery Corse and William R. Terry's Brigade, and Brigadier Generals Matt Ransom's and William Henry Wallace's brigades from Johnson's division, a cavalry division under Major General Fitzhugh Lee and six guns under the command of Colonel William Pegram to Five Forks on March 30. Then he sent Terry's brigade and Corse's brigade to the south. Nonetheless, a gap continued to exist between Pickett's force and McGowan's brigade at the end of the Confederate White Oak Road Line. Lee ordered Hunton's brigade to stand in reserve near Manchester, Virginia where it could support Pickett or move by rail to defend the junction of the Southside Railroad and Richmond and Danville Railroad at Burkeville, Virginia if a Union force moved to attack it.

March 30, 1865 action

Rain poured down on the area all night on March 29 and continued the following day, which limited the fighting on that day. Sheridan later stated that Grant thought about suspending operations altogether until the weather cleared and the ground dried but Sheridan convinced him to press ahead. On March 30, half of Sheridan's cavalry under Brigadier General Thomas Devin skirmished with Confederate cavalry under Fitzhugh Lee. As they approached Five Forks, a patrol of the 6th United States Cavalry Regiment under Major Robert M. Morris encountered Fitzhugh Lee's troopers and lost 3 officers and 20 men in the encounter. The Confederates also suffered some casualties, including Brigadier General William H. F. Payne who was wounded. Skirmishing with and reacting to feints from Union patrols from the 6th Pennsylvania Cavalry under Colonel Charles L. Leiper delayed Pickett's force from reaching Five Forks until 4:30 p.m. Rosser's and Rooney Lee's cavalry divisions arrived even later.

Meanwhile, skirmishers from Warren's V Corps kept the Confederates in their White Oak Road Line between the Boydton Plank Road and Claiborne Road. Despite incomplete information and somewhat vague and conflicting orders from Meade and Grant, on Grant's order, Warren pushed the Union V Corps forward to strengthen his hold on a part of the Boydton Plank Road and the V Corps entrenched a line to cover that road from its intersection with Dabney Mill Road south to Gravelly Run. In the afternoon, Warren saw Griffin's men take over Confederate outposts but he also saw that movement further up the Boydton Plank Road was covered by Confederate artillery and fortifications.

Humphrey's II Corps closed the gap between the V Corps and the XXIV Corps. The latter corps captured a large part of the Confederate picket line.

Brigadier General Romeyn B. Ayres's division of the V Corps made a reconnaissance toward the White Oak Road a short distance west of Claiborne Road. The lead brigade under Colonel Frederick Winthrop crossed a swollen branch of Gravelly Run which was to feature in the following day's battle. Two other brigades did not cross but began to entrench. Ayres saw only empty space to the northeast and failed to see heavy fortifications near the intersection of White Oak Road and Claiborne Road which angled sharply back to Hatcher's Run directly to his north. As dark approached, Ayres had a number of outposts prepared to cover his position. Union casualties for the March 30 actions at the White Oak Line were 1 killed, 7 wounded and 15 missing; the number of Confederate casualties is unknown.

Prelude to March 31, 1865 battles

The fighting, maneuvering and skirmishing at Lewis's Farm on March 29, 1865 and in the vicinity of that farm along the White Oak Road Line on March 30, 1865 set the stage for the Battle of White Oak Road and the Battle of Dinwiddie Court House on March 31, 1865.

Footnotes

Notes

References
 Bearss, Edwin C., with Bryce A. Suderow. The Petersburg Campaign. Vol. 2, The Western Front Battles, September 1864 – April 1865. El Dorado Hills, CA: Savas Beatie, 2014. .
 Beringer, Richard E., Herman Hattaway, Archer Jones, and William N. Still, Jr. Why the South Lost the Civil War. Athens: University of Georgia Press, 1986. .
 Calkins, Chris. The Appomattox Campaign, March 29 – April 9, 1865. Conshohocken, PA: Combined Books, 1997. .
 Chamberlain, Joshua L. The Passing of Armies: An Account of the Final Campaign of the Army of the Potomac. New York: Bantam Books, 1993. . First published New York and London, G.P. Putnam's Sons, 1915.
 Foote, Shelby. The Civil War: A Narrative. Vol. 3, Red River to Appomattox. New York: Random House, 1974. .
 Greene, A. Wilson. The Final Battles of the Petersburg Campaign: Breaking the Backbone of the Rebellion. Knoxville: University of Tennessee Press, 2008. .
 Hattaway, Herman, and Archer Jones. How the North Won: A Military History of the Civil War. Urbana: University of Illinois Press, 1983. .
 Hess, Earl J. In the Trenches at Petersburg: Field Fortifications & Confederate Defeat. Chapel Hill: University of North Carolina Press, 2009. .
 Kennedy, Frances H., ed., The Civil War Battlefield Guide, 2nd ed., Houghton Mifflin Co., 1998, .
 Longacre, Edward G. The Cavalry at Appomattox: A Tactical Study of Mounted Operations During the Civil War's Climactic Campaign, March 27 – April 9, 1865. Mechanicsburg, PA: Stackpole Books, 2003. .
 Salmon, John S., The Official Virginia Civil War Battlefield Guide, Stackpole Books, 2001, .
 Trudeau, Noah Andre. The Last Citadel: Petersburg, Virginia, June 1864–April 1865. Baton Rouge: Louisiana State University Press, 1991. .
 Trulock, Alice Rains. In the Hands of Providence: Joshua L. Chamberlain and the American Civil War. Chapel Hill: University of North Carolina Press, 1992. .
 Weigley, Russell F. A Great Civil War: A Military and Political History, 1861–1865. Bloomington and Indianapolis: Indiana University Press, 2000. .

External links
Map: 
 Copyrighted Map and Order of Battle for Lewis's Farm

Lewis's Farm
Lewis's Farm
Lewis's Farm
Lewis's Farm
Lewis's Farm
1865 in the American Civil War
1865 in Virginia
March 1865 events